Fort Ellice was a Hudson's Bay Company trading post operated from 1794 to 1892. First established on the Qu'Appelle River, the post was rebuilt in 1817 on the south bank of the Assiniboine. Another iteration of the post was built near the first in 1862 and, in 1873, replaced Fort Pelly as the headquarters for the Swan River District. The fort was located in what is now west-central Manitoba, Canada, just east of that province's border with Saskatchewan.

It was an important fort, as it was a major stopping point on the Carlton Trail, which ran from the Red River Colony to Fort Edmonton. (The section leading from Upper Fort Garry to this district was commonly known as the Fort Ellice Trail.)

A second more elaborate structure was built in 1862 by the HBC but its economic life was short-lived as the Company relinquished control of Rupert's Land with the 1870 Deed of Surrender. This deed transferred many HBC rights to the new Canadian national government.

The fort had one more important role to play in history; it acted as a staging point for part of the North-West Mounted Police (NWMP) force that started at Fort Dufferin and headed west in 1874 to establish law and order in the future provinces of Alberta and Saskatchewan. The fort acted as an NWMP post beginning in 1875.

The fort was named after Edward Ellice, a British merchant and an investor in the Hudson's Bay Company. Fort Ellice in turn gave its name to the Rural Municipality of Ellice in west-central Manitoba and to Ellice Avenue, a major arterial road in Winnipeg.

The property that supports both forts is currently owned and managed by the Nature Conservancy of Canada.

References

External links 
 
 Manitoba Community Profiles
 History in Winnipeg Street Names from the Manitoba Historical Society
 Fort Ellice property photos from Nature Conservancy of Canada
 Google trekker - virtual hike of Fort Ellice property https://www.google.com/maps/@50.4027067,-101.2869901,3a,50.4y,283.13h,76.29t/data=!3m6!1e1!3m4!1sUF2N0E_pMD23ln2H07fipw!2e0!7i13312!8i6656

Forts in Manitoba
Hudson's Bay Company forts
North-West Mounted Police forts
1831 establishments in the British Empire